"I Can't Stand It!" is a song by Dutch-American group Twenty 4 Seven, released as the debut single from their first album, Street Moves (1991). The song was produced by Dutch producer Ruud van Rijen and American producer/rapper/dancer Tony Dawson-Harrison (Captain Hollywood). The first version of the single featured rap vocals from rapper Ricardo Overman (MC Fixxit). After Overman's quick departure from the act, a new version of the single was recorded with Harrison. Both versions of the single featured singing vocals from Dutch singer Nancy Coolen. The single reached number one in Italy and the Top 5 position in several European countries, including Sweden, Germany, Austria, Spain and Switzerland. The single also charted at No. 17 in the Netherlands and No.7 in the UK.

Critical reception
Larry Flick from Billboard described the song as a "light and catchy hip-houser". A reviewer from Music & Media wrote, "I Can't Stand It will never be regarded as innovative: the Martin Luther King "Robbed Of Our Nation..!' speech, the Kraftwerk-like synth, the ooh's and yeah' s have all been heard before, but seldom in such a strong pop context. The chorus, sung by Dutch Wendy James look-alike Nancy, is extremely catchy." The magazine also stated, "Without doubt one of the strongest hip house records for some time, one that really stands out from the crowd."

Music video

There were two different music videos for the single albeit had the same setting (set outside a church with a Cadillac parked in front of it). The original hip-house version features Fixxit, Coolen and the dancers along with additional female dancers. When it later released internationally as a single it was redone with Hollywood as the featured rapper in place of Fixxit. Even the scene where the Cadillac's owner pushed aside the rappers was altered; Fixxit riding off in a bike, Hollywood in a car in need of gasoline. The video's song and message also featured the image and quotes of Nelson Mandela flashing in the song break.

Track listing

 CD mini, Netherlands
 "I Can't Stand It!" (Original Single Version) — 4:09
 "I Can't Stand It!" (Hip House Single Version) — 3:59
 "I Can't Stand It!" (12" Club Mix) — 6:33
 "I Can't Stand It!" (12" Hip House Remix) — 6:02

 CD maxi, UK & Europe 
 "I Can't Stand It!" (Radio Version) — 4:05
 "I Can't Stand It!" (Hip House Remix) — 6:10
 "I Can't Stand It!" (Long Instrumental) — 6:10

 CD maxi, UK & Europe
 "I Can't Stand It!" (Radio Remix) — 3:35
 "I Can't Stand It!" (Club Remix) — 9:35
 "I Can't Stand It!" (Dub Mix) — 6:40

 Vinyl 12", Australia
 "I Can't Stand It!" (Original Version) — 4:09
 "I Can't Stand It!" (Hip House Version) — 3:59
 "I Can't Stand It!" (12" Club Mix) — 6:33
 "I Can't Stand It!" (12" Hip House Remix) — 6:02

 Vinyl 12", Canada
 "I Can't Stand It!" (Club Mix) — 9:35
 "I Can't Stand It!" (Hip House Mix) — 6:10

Charts and certifications

Weekly charts

 1 "Twenty 4th Street" - I Can't Stand It!.   –

Year-end charts

Certifications

References

External links
 "I Can't Stand It" (featuring Captain Hollywood) at YouTube
 "I Can't Stand It" (featuring MC Fixxit) at YouTube

1989 songs
1990 debut singles
Central Station Records singles
Number-one singles in Italy
Songs against racism and xenophobia
Songs written by Ruud van Rijen
Twenty 4 Seven songs